Cincinnati Township is located in Tazewell County, Illinois. As of the 2010 census, its population was 9,506 and it contained 3,436 housing units.
The township is based in the Village of South Pekin, Illinois.

Geography

Demographics

As of 2016, approximately 9220 people live in the area.

Communities

Cities 
Pekin

Villages 
South Pekin

Unincorporated communities 
Garmen
Glenmar Addition
Midway

Transportation

Major highways
 Illinois Route 29

Airports
 Pekin Municipal Airport (C15) - serves Pekin (Located by the Village of South Pekin, Illinois)

References

External links
City-data.com
Illinois State Archives

Townships in Tazewell County, Illinois
Peoria metropolitan area, Illinois
Townships in Illinois